AB-CHFUPYCA (also AB-CHMFUPPYCA) is a compound that was first identified as a component of synthetic cannabis products in Japan in 2015. The name "AB-CHFUPYCA" is an acronym of its systematic name N-(1-Amino-3-methyl-1-oxoButan-2-yl)-1-(CycloHexylmethyl)-3-(4-FlUorophenyl)-1H-PYrazole-5-CarboxAmide. There are two known regioisomers of AB-CHFUPYCA:  3,5-AB-CHMFUPPYCA (pictured) and 5,3-AB-CHMFUPPYCA. The article[1] refers to both 3,5-AB-CHMFUPPYCA and 5,3-AB-CHMFUPPYCA as AB-CHMFUPPYCA isomers, so AB-CHMFUPPYCA and AB-CHFUPYCA are not names for a unique chemical structure.

AB-CHFUPYCA contains some similar structural elements to other synthetic cannabinoids such as 5F-AB-FUPPYCA, JWH-307, JWH-030, JWH-147, AB-PINACA. It may be considered an analog of the traditional pyrazole cannabinoid receptor 1 antagonist rimonabant. The pharmacological properties of AB-CHFUPYCA have not been studied.

See also 

 5F-AB-FUPPYCA
 AM-6545
 TM-38837
 Rimonabant
 JWH-307
 JWH-147
 JWH-030
 5F-PB22  
 5F-AB-PINACA
 5F-ADB
 5F-AMB
 5F-APINACA
 AB-CHMFUPPYCA
 AB-FUBINACA
 AB-PINACA
 ADB-CHMINACA
 ADB-FUBINACA
 ADB-PINACA
 ADBICA
 APICA
 APINACA
 MDMB-CHMICA

References 

Cannabinoids
Designer drugs
Fluoroarenes
Pyrazoles
Pyrazolecarboxamides